"Light Me Up" is a song by English musician Birdy. The song was released as a digital download on 23 February 2014 in the United Kingdom, as the third single from her second studio album, Fire Within (2013). The song was written by Birdy, Trey Starxx, Tom Hull and produced by Rich Costey.

Track listing

Weekly charts

Release history

References

2014 singles
Birdy (singer) songs
2013 songs
Warner Music Group singles
Songs written by Kid Harpoon